The 1890–91 Scottish Cup was the 18th season of Scotland's most prestigious football knockout competition. Heart of Midlothian defeated Dumbarton 1–0 to win the trophy.

First round

 *     Match Declared Void
   St Johnstone Declared winner against Coupar after 2–2 draw
St Bernards Disqualified

Beith, Bellstane Birds, Glengowan, Portland Lybstor and Edinburgh University received byes into the second round.

First round replay

Second round

Match Declared Void

Dundee Our Boys, Edinburgh University and Stranraer received byes into the third round.

Second round replay

Third round

Arbroath and 5th KRV received byes into the Fourth round.

Third round replay

Fourth round

Fifth round

Match declared void

East Stirlingshire, Leith Athletic, Abercorn and Third Lanark received byes into the quarter-final.

Fifth round replay

Match abandoned

Fifth round second replay

Quarter-final

Quarter-final replay

Quarter-final second replay

Semi-finals

Final

See also
1890–91 in Scottish football

References

RSSF Scottish Cup 90-91
London Hearts 1890-91

1890-1891
Cup
Cup